"General Cederschiöld" is a Swedish military march, composed by military composer Per Grundström. The march was composed in 1936, during Grundström's tenure as music director at Svea Life Guards, and was dedicated to the executive officer Hugo Cederschiöld. It was also adopted as the honorary march of the Härnösand Coastal Artillery Regiment.

Swedish military marches